Glenea medea is a species of beetle in the family Cerambycidae. It was described by Francis Polkinghorne Pascoe in 1867. It is known from Borneo and Malaysia.

References

medea
Beetles described in 1867